The West Bengal women's football team is an Indian women's football team representing West Bengal in the Senior Women's National Football Championship.

History
West Bengal women's football team have appeared in the Women's National Championship finals fifteen times, and have won the championship two times. They were the winner of the inaugural season of Women's National Championship in 1991–92	and last won it in 1996–97 held at Haldia. Legendary football manager Sushil Bhattacharya became the first head coach of the team in 1975.

Honours
 Senior Women's National Football Championship
 Winners (2): 1991–92, 1996–97
 Runners-up (13): 1992–93, 1994–95, 1995–96, 1997–98, 1998–99, 1999–00, 2000–01, 2002–03, 2003–04, 2004–05, 2006–07, 2008–09, 2010–11

National Games
 Silver medal (2): 1999, 2002
 Bronze medal (3): 2001, 2007, 2011

 Junior Girl's National Football Championship
 Winners (1): 2011–12
 Runners-up (1): 2003–04

 Sub–Junior Girl's National Football Championship
 Winners (1): 2010–11

References

Football in West Bengal
Women's football teams in India
Year of establishment missing